The Diocese of San Fernando de La Union is a Latin Church ecclesiastical territory or diocese of the Catholic Church in the Philippines. The diocese was established in 1970 from the Archdiocese of Nueva Segovia. It is a suffragan in the ecclesiastical province of the metropolitan Archdiocese of Lingayen-Dagupan.

Ordinaries

See also
Catholic Church in the Philippines
List of Catholic dioceses in the Philippines

References

San Fernando de La Union
San Fernando de La Union
Christian organizations established in 1970
Roman Catholic dioceses and prelatures established in the 20th century
Religion in La Union
San Fernando, La Union